Oxepin-CoA hydrolase (paaZ (gene)) is an enzyme with systematic name 2-oxepin-2(3H)-ylideneacetyl-CoA hydrolyase. This enzyme catalyses the following chemical reaction

 2-oxepin-2(3H)-ylideneacetyl-CoA + H2O  3-oxo-5,6-dehydrosuberyl-CoA semialdehyde

The enzyme is present in bacteria Escherichia coli.

References

External links 
 

EC 3.7.1